The Japanese black bear (Ursus thibetanus japonicus) is a subspecies of the Asian black bear that lives on two main islands of Japan: Honshu and Shikoku. There are an estimated 10,000 black bears in Japan. The population of black bears on Shikoku is endangered at less than 30 individuals and the last confirmed sighting of a bear on the island of Kyushu was in 1987 making them likely extinct on the island prior to the 21st century. There is a high price on bear parts in the black market, which threatens all bear populations in Japan.

Diet 

These bears are typically herbivorous, eating mainly grasses and herbs during the spring. During the summer, they switch to berries and nuts to feed themselves for their hibernation. The bear is able to get the berries and nuts by climbing trees and using their claws to grab the food. These animals can be omnivorous and eat other wild animals and livestock when there is a need. Typical prey species include Japanese serow wild boar, and sika deer. Like other bears, cannibalism occurs, as has been demonstrated when bone fragments and claws of a cub were found inside the stomach of a male black bear. They have also been documented consuming invasive species such as nutria.

Habitat 

The bears live on two Japanese islands: Honshu and Shikoku. They tend to live in areas where there is an abundance of grasses and trees with berries to support their diet.

Seed dispersal 
Forests rely on bears as a great method for plants and trees to spread their seeds. The bears will consume the seeds and move 40% farther than a distance of 500 m from the parent tree. They have the potential to spread seeds over huge areas, helping the plant life spread throughout the area. In autumn, the bears have a greater seed dispersal rate and usually the males have a larger dispersal areas than females.

Conservation 
There has been a huge impact on Japanese black bears' populations due to human interference. Habitat destruction is a problem for these bears as peoples' villages begin to grow. Over-hunting and poaching is also a problem. Bears' parts can be sold on the black market for a high price, which makes them very desirable. People kill a lot of these bears, reducing their numbers drastically. Because of this and the carrying capacity reduction due to habitat destruction has resulted in the recognition that the Japanese black bear is at a high risk of extinction. The subspecies will likely be gone within the next 100 years at the rate they are currently declining.

References

Bibliography 

Asiatic black bears
Mammals of Japan